King of the Jungle is an American reality television program that aired on the Animal Planet. The original series debuted in 2003 and starred a group of 12 "animal experts" and was hosted by Jeff Corwin. In it, each "expert" had to face a number of physical challenges pertaining to the outdoors or wildlife in some fashion.

References

External links
 
 
 

Animal Planet original programming
2000s American reality television series
2003 American television series debuts
2004 American television series endings
Television shows set in Florida